C. Stephen Foster is an American ophthalmologist, known for his research and treatment of ocular inflammatory disease (OID) with immunomodulatory therapy. He has published over 700 peer reviewed journal articles and authored 3 textbooks in his field.

Education
Foster was born and raised in West Virginia. He completed his Bachelor of Science Degree in Chemistry at Duke University, with Distinction and Phi Beta Kappa in 1965, and received his Doctor of Medicine Degree at Duke University Medical Center, in 1969, being elected to Alpha Omega Alpha. In 1975, he completed his residency at Barnes Hospital, St. Louis followed by fellowships in Cornea and External Diseases and ocular immunology at the Massachusetts Eye and Ear Infirmary (MEEI) in Boston, Massachusetts in 1977.

Career
After his fellowship, Foster joined the full-time faculty in the Department of Ophthalmology at Harvard Medical School, serving as the director of the residency training program at MEEI. In 1980, he created its first ocular immunology service, and created the Uveitis and Ocular Immunology Fellowship to train ophthalmologists in 1984.

In 2005, he formed his own  eye care facility, Massachusetts Eye Research and Surgery Institution (MERSI), and a foundation, the Ocular Immunology and Uveitis Foundation (OIUF)

Foster developed the "step ladder approach to care" for treating patients with ocular inflammatory disease. This standard of care in treating uveitis/OID was published in July 2015 as the preferred practice patterns in the Journal of Survey of Ophthalmology.

Awards and achievements
Foster has received the American Academy of Ophthalmology Award in 1983, the Research to Prevent Blindness Senior Scientific Investigator Award in 1995, and  Mildred Weisenfeld Award for Excellence in Ophthalmology in 2005. He received a lifetime achievement award from the Academy of Ophthalmology in 2007.

In 2016, Foster was named as one of America's top doctors in ophthalmology for the 15th consecutive year.

He has been featured in two Mystery Diagnosis episodes, The Sickest Patient in the Hospital and Behcet’s Disease on Discovery Health television network. Foster is a member of the American Ophthalmology Society and American Uveitis Society. As of Spring 2016, his work had been cited over 21,000 times.

References

External links
Bio

American ophthalmologists
American medical writers
American male non-fiction writers
Harvard Medical School faculty
Duke University Trinity College of Arts and Sciences alumni
Year of birth missing (living people)
Living people
Duke University School of Medicine alumni